Gianluigi is an Italian masculine given name meaning "John Louis". It is often an abbreviation of "Giovanni Luigi". Famous people with this given name include:

Gianluigi Braschi, Italian film producer
Gianluigi Buffon, Italian footballer
Gianluigi Donnarumma, Italian footballer
Gianluigi Gelmetti, Italian conductor
Gianluigi Lentini, Italian footballer, once the most expensive player
Gianluigi Scalvini, Italian motorcycle road racer
Gianluigi Trovesi, Italian jazz saxophonist
Gianluigi Zuddas, Italian author
Gianluigi Galli, Italian racing driver
Gianluigi Nuzzi, Italian journalist, essayist and television presenter
Gianluigi Paragone, Italian journalist and television presenter
Gianluigi Quinzi, Italian tennis player 
Gian Luigi Bonelli, Italian cartoonist, writer and publisher
Gian Luigi Gessa, psychiatrist and Italian pharmacologist
Gian Luigi Polidoro, Italian director, actor and screenwriter
Gian Luigi Zampieri, Italian conductor
Gian Luigi Boiardi, Italian politician
Gian Luigi Nespoli, Italian poet and writer
Gian Luigi Rondi, Italian screenwriter
Gian Luigi Berti, Sammarinese captain regent
Gian Luigi Macina, Sammarinese long distance runner

See also
 Gian
 Giovanni (name)
 John (first name)
 John Louis (disambiguation)
 Giancarlo

Italian masculine given names